There Goes the Groom is a 1937 screwball comedy film directed by Joseph Santley and starring Ann Sothern and Burgess Meredith. It was Burgess Meredith's second film and his first screen comedy; his first film, Winterset (1936), was a serious romantic drama.

Plot
Dick Matthews (Burgess Meredith), just out of college, heads for the gold fields of Alaska to find his fortune. When he returns to marry his girl friend Janet Russell (Louise Henry), he discovers that she is no longer interested him. When her mother learns that the fellow has struck it rich, she changes her daughter's mind. Unfortunately, the young man has become enamored of the girl's little sister Betty (Ann Sothern).

Cast
 Ann Sothern as Betty Russell
 Burgess Meredith as Dick Matthews
 Mary Boland as Mrs. Russell
 Onslow Stevens as Dr. Becker
 William Brisbane as Potter Russell
 Louise Henry as Janet Russell
 Roger Imhof as Hank
 Sumner Getchell as Billy Rapp
 George Irving as Yacht Captain
 Leona Roberts as Martha
 Adrian Morris as Eddie - Interne

Production
The working title for the film was "Don't Forget to Remember".  The part played by Burgess Meredith was originally scheduled to be played by John Boles.

Critical response
Variety said about the film, "The yarn is well-worn around the edges, but ... buoyantly and skillfully acted by each least or large member of the cast... The direction, camera and production are all first-rate. Theatres catering to smart clientele should especially look into There Goes the Groom," while The New York Times said it was  "an amiable comedy [which] ... may best be described as a cinematic exercise for Burgess Meredith, who dominates the whole affair. His performance, like the film, is occasionally brilliant, but on the whole does not merit more than a polite, indulgent commendation... [He] appears to be more at ease before the camera than he was in the memorable Winterset. His approach is less strained and he seems to have dropped most of his stage mannerisms."

References

External links 
 
 
 
 

1937 films
American black-and-white films
1930s screwball comedy films
1930s English-language films
American screwball comedy films
Films with screenplays by Dorothy Yost
1937 comedy films
Films directed by Joseph Santley
1930s American films